William Bruce Davis (born January 13, 1938) is a Canadian actor, best known for his role as the Cigarette Smoking Man on The X-Files. Besides appearing in many TV programs and movies, he founded his own acting school, the William Davis Centre for Actors Study. In his personal life, he is an avid water-skier, lectures on skepticism at events such as the Committee for Skeptical Inquiry's CSICon, and advocates for action on climate change. In 2011 he published his memoir, Where There's Smoke ... The Musings of a Cigarette Smoking Man.

Early life and education 
Davis was born in Toronto to a lawyer father and psychologist mother. He began his acting career as a child in 1949, in radio drama and summer stock theatre. His cousins Murray and Donald Davis ran the Straw Hat Players in Ontario in the late 1940s and early 1950s, and rehearsed in the basement of Davis's house. When they needed a boy they gave William his first professional acting job. He subsequently became a boy actor on Canadian Broadcasting Corporation (CBC) radio before his voice broke. In 1955 he enrolled at the University of Toronto to study philosophy, but actively pursued an acting career, as did his friend Donald Sutherland. In 1959, he graduated from the University of Toronto with a Bachelor of Arts degree in philosophy. While at university he switched his attention from acting to directing and with his partner, Karl Jaffary, ran the Straw Hat Players for four years.

Career 
In 1960, Davis went to England to train at the London Academy of Music and Dramatic Art. He worked in the UK for the next five years directing in repertory theatres and acting schools. He was artistic director of the Dundee Repertory Theatre. His last position in the UK was as an assistant director at the National Theatre of Great Britain under Laurence Olivier where he worked with Albert Finney, Maggie Smith, Derek Jacobi, and Ronald Pickup among others. He returned to Canada in 1965 to work at the National Theatre School of Canada and soon, at the age of 28, was appointed artistic director of the English acting section. During this period he was also active as a freelance director at major Canadian theatres. In 1971 he joined the newly formed drama department at Bishop's University in Lennoxvile, Quebec. While there he became the founding artistic director of Festival Lennoxville, a professional summer theatre that ran for the next decade.

Returning to Toronto in the late seventies, Davis spent several years as a radio drama director and on the faculty of Humber College. In demand as an acting teacher during this period, he resumed acting after an absence of nearly 20 years. He earned a number of roles on stage and film before accepting the position of artistic director of the Vancouver Playhouse Acting School, which required relocating with his wife and family. Davis writes in his memoir, "And so, in the fall of 1985, we hitched our second hand boat to our second hand car and drove across the country."

While his time at the Vancouver Playhouse was short-lived, he remained in Vancouver where he founded his own acting school, the William Davis Centre for Actors Study, a training ground for several future stars including New Zealand actress Lucy Lawless. Acting roles became more frequent, leading up to his iconic role as the Cigarette Smoking Man (also called the "Cancer Man") on the hit TV series The X-Files, where he made frequent appearances for the next nine years. Davis has also had a wide range of roles in other series, including Stargate SG-1 and Smallville, and has participated in a host of television movies and other projects. From time to time he attends fan conventions, signing autographs and copies of his memoir.

In recent years Davis has returned to directing theatre and film. He wrote and directed three short films, and co-wrote and directed several episodes of a television series for CBC Television, 49th & Main. In 2011 he directed two plays for The United Players of Vancouver: Waste by Harley Granville Barker, and Hay Fever by Noël Coward. Most recently he directed The Habit of Art (2013) by Alan Bennett, Sherlock Holmes and the Case of the Jersey Lily (2015) by Katie Forgette, and Robert Bolt's A Man for All Seasons at the Jericho Arts Centre in Vancouver, British Columbia.

During that period, he also appeared in 10 episodes of the Canadian hit show Continuum as Older Alec Sadler on Showcase. Most recently, he reprised his iconic X-Files role in the six-episode Season 10.[17]

Personal life 
Despite being known for his smoking character, Davis quit smoking in the 1970s. When The X-Files started,  he was given a choice between herbal cigarettes and tobacco cigarettes. At first he chose to use tobacco, but switched to herbal because he feared becoming addicted to them again. He used his notoriety on the show to assist the Canadian Cancer Society in its programs to combat smoking. In 2014, he donated his investments that supported fossil fuels to the David Suzuki Foundation in an effort to both ethically invest, and help fund work to fight climate change. He is a passionate advocate for action in response to climate change, believing it a critical issue of our time and speaking on the subject often. Taking action on a personal level, he drives a Tesla powered by hydroelectricity.

He is also a former national champion water skier and for a time held records in older age divisions. In a conversation with Brendan Beiser, he said he held the record for tricks in his age category, adding: "I did hold the slalom record until this past year until some young whippersnapper of 65 from Ontario took the record away from me."

In 2011, Davis married Emmanuelle Herpin. He has two daughters, Melinda and Rebecca, from an earlier marriage, and two grandchildren.

Skepticism 

While on The X-Files, Davis was constantly challenged by fans of the show about his non-belief in the paranormal and aliens. Davis credits Barry Beyerstein and the Committee for Skeptical Inquiry (CSI) for introducing him to the sceptic community. Davis became increasingly involved in the sceptic movement and began to give lectures as a sceptic spokesman at universities across North America and at sceptic conventions, including CSI's CSICon in New Orleans.

When asked about his belief in the paranormal at the London Film and Comic Con in 2010, Davis replied, "The onus is on you to prove the extraordinary ... I did a lot of research and saw where a lot of the arguments were wanting."

Interviewed by Jacob Fortin on guilt about being a sceptic yet acting in a show that Richard Dawkins campaigned against, Davis replied that at first he had some trepidation until realizing that Dawkins "had no evidence whatsoever and presented none" that the show encouraged people to think uncritically. "The show is fiction ... it isn't a documentary." In another interview with Justin Trottier of the Centre for Inquiry Canada, Davis answered similarly, adding that from his own informal polls of audiences of X-Files fans it seemed there was no greater belief in the paranormal than the normal population and he comforted himself with this thought.

Asked about a debate Davis moderated with alien abduction believer John E. Mack, Davis said that many people expected him to support Mack, but they discovered that he was "way on the other side". Davis recounted that he had some great discussions with Mack; "He was brilliant ... he was wrong, but he was very good ... One of the problems with human intelligence is that we are so good at defending ideas that we arrived at irrationally."

In 2002, Davis narrated a Discovery Science Channel docuseries, The Critical Eye. Produced in association with Skeptical Inquirer magazine, the series examined pseudoscientific and paranormal phenomena.

Filmography

Film

Television films

Television series

References

External links 

Official website

1938 births
Living people
University of Toronto alumni
Academic staff of Bishop's University
Canadian male film actors
Canadian male television actors
Male actors from Toronto
Writers from Toronto
Canadian skeptics
Canadian television producers
Canadian television writers
Canadian male television writers
Canadian people of Welsh descent